The final of the Women's High Jump event at the 2006 European Athletics Championships in Gothenborg, Sweden was held on August 11, 2006. Belgium's Tia Hellebaut won the competition setting a new championship and a national record (2.03 metres). By winning Hellebaut gave Belgium its second gold medal at these championships after Kim Gevaert had already won the women's 100 metres event. Ten minutes after the high jump competition ended, Gevaert ran the final of the women's 200 metres and won a third gold medal for Belgium.

Medalists

Schedule

Records

Results

Qualification
Qualification: Qualifying Performance 1.92 (Q) or at least 12 best performers (q) advance to the final.

Final

References
 Official results
Results
Results

High Jump
High jump at the European Athletics Championships
2006 in women's athletics